The 2014 South American Aerobic Gymnastics Championships were held in Asunción, Paraguay, November 25–30, 2014. The competition was organized by the Paraguayan Gymnastics Federation.

Participating countries

Medalists

References

2014 in gymnastics
2014 in Paraguayan sport
South American Gymnastics Championships